Sadie Lee is a painter, best known for her feminist pieces.

Early life and education 
Sadie Lee was born in 1967 and grew up in Yorkshire, England. She studied as a Fine Art student at the Epsom School of Art and later studied mural painting and marbling at the Hackney Institute. She moved to London in 1988.

Work 
Lee's painting of David Hoyle is included in Queer Britain and won the 2021 Queer Britain Madame F Award.

References

External links 
 Sadie Lee's webpage
 Collection of Sadie Lee's works

1967 births
Living people
British artists
British women artists